Nežárka is a river in South Bohemia, Czech Republic. It flows into the Lužnice in Veselí nad Lužnicí. It is 56.0 km (35 miles) long, and its basin area is 1,001 km2. The river flows through Jindřichův Hradec and Stráž nad Nežárkou.

References

External links 
 
  Info

Rivers of the South Bohemian Region